Pseudaletis malangi, the Malang's fantasy, is a butterfly in the family Lycaenidae. It is found in Guinea. The habitat consists of dry, open forests.

Adults are on wing in September.

References

Butterflies described in 1995
Pseudaletis